A wig-wag is a device for flashing an automobile's headlamps, in its simplest form so that only one of the two headlights operates at a time, with the two flashing at a preset rate. In its traditional form a wig-wag constitutes the illuminating of the right and left headlamps alternately, with each lamp lit for around half a second at a time. In the United Kingdom the wig-wag is only seen on the road on emergency vehicles. The 'standard' wig-wag is often used within a cycle of other illumination patterns, such as swiftly alternating the left and right headlights, alternating the left and right headlights slowly, or flashing both headlights together, and using a mixture of high- and low-/dipped-beams.

Although the use of flashing headlights does increase the visibility of any vehicle, it can also create problems. In situations when highbeam headlights are flashed, the wig-wag may create glare or may otherwise temporarily blind the drivers of oncoming vehicles.

Generally, wig-wags are prohibited on all vehicles except emergency vehicles. However, the road rules in New South Wales, Australia, and some areas in the United States allow school buses to have flashing headlights. In New South Wales specifically additional Wig-Wag lights (separate from the headlights) are used on all public transport buses. In the United States, motorcycles are similarly allowed to be equipped with a headlamp modulator to increase conspicuity during the daytime.
In the United States specifically, additional Wig-Wag lights (separate from the headlights) are used on all public transport buses, and can use white (clear) lights to increase conspicuity during the daytime.

Notes

See also 
 Emergency vehicle equipment
 Motorcycle headlamp modulator

Emergency vehicles